Medical education in the United States includes educational activities involved in the education and training of physicians in the country, with the overall process going from entry-level training efforts through to the continuing education of qualified specialists in the context of American colleges and universities. 

A typical outline of the medical education pathway is presented below. However, medicine is a diverse profession with many options available. For example, some physicians work in pharmaceutical research, occupational medicine (within a company), public health medicine (working for the general health of a population in an area), or even join the armed forces in America.

Issues in higher education in the U.S. have particular resonance in this context, with multiple analysts expressing concern of a physician shortage in the nation. 'Medical deserts' have also been a topic of concern.

Medical school

In the U.S., a medical school is an institution with the purpose of educating medical students in the field of medicine.  Admission into medical school may not technically require completion of a previous degree; however, applicants are usually required to complete at least 3 years of "pre-med" courses at the university level because in the US medical degrees are classified as Second entry degrees.  Once enrolled in a medical school the four years progressive study is divided into two roughly equal components: pre-clinical (consisting of didactic courses in the basic sciences) and clinical (clerkships consisting of rotations through different wards of a teaching hospital).  The degree granted at the conclusion of these four years of study is Doctor of Medicine (M.D.) or Doctor of Osteopathic Medicine (D.O.) depending on the medical school; both degrees allow the holder to practice medicine after completing an accredited residency program.

Internship

During the last year of graduate medical education, students apply for postgraduate residencies in their chosen field of specialization. These vary in competitiveness depending upon the desirability of the specialty, prestige of the program, and the number of applicants relative to the number of available positions.  All but a few positions are granted via a national computer match which pairs an applicant's preference with the programs' preference for applicants. 

Historically, post-graduate medical education began with a free-standing, one-year internship. Completion of this year continues to be the minimum training requirement for obtaining a general license to practice medicine in most states. However, because of the gradual lengthening of post-graduate medical education, and the decline of its use as the terminal stage in training, most new physicians complete the internship requirement as their first year of residency.

Not withstanding the trend toward internships integrated into categorical residencies, the one-year "traditional rotating internship" (sometimes called a "transitional year") continues to exist.  Some residency training programs, such as in neurology and ophthalmology, do not include an internship year and begin after completion of an internship or transitional year.  Some use it to re-apply to programs into which they were not accepted, while others use it as a year to decide upon a specialty. In addition, osteopathic physicians "are required to have completed an American Osteopathic Association (AOA)-approved first year of training in order to be licensed in Florida, Michigan, Oklahoma and Pennsylvania."

Residency

Each of the specialties in medicine has established its own curriculum, which defines the length and content of residency training necessary to practice in that specialty.  Programs range from 3 years after medical school for internal medicine and pediatrics, to 5 years for general surgery, to 7 years for neurosurgery.   Each specialty training program either incorporates an internship year to satisfy the requirements of state licensure, or stipulates that an internship year be completed before starting the program at the second post-graduate year (PGY-2).

Fellowship

A fellowship is a formal, full-time training program that focuses on a particular area within the specialty, with requirements beyond the related residency.  Many highly specialized fields require formal training beyond residency.  Examples of these include cardiology, endocrinology, oncology after internal medicine; cardiothoracic anesthesiology after anesthesiology; cardiothoracic surgery, pediatric surgery, surgical oncology after general surgery; reproductive endocrinology/infertility, maternal-fetal medicine, gynecologic oncology after obstetrics/gynecology. There are many others for each field of study. In some specialties such as pathology and radiology, a majority of graduating residents go on to further their training. The training programs for these fields are known as fellowships and their participants are fellows, to denote that they already have completed a residency and are board eligible or board certified in their basic specialty. Fellowships range in length from one to three years and are granted by application to the individual program or sub-specialty organizing board. Fellowships often contain a research component.

Board certification

The physician or surgeon who has completed their residency and possibly fellowship training and is in the practice of their specialty is known as an attending physician.  Physicians then must pass written and oral exams in their specialty in order to become board certified.  Each of the 26 medical specialties has different requirements for practitioners to undertake continuing medical education activities.

Continuing Medical Education 

Continuing medical education (CME) refers to educational activities designed for practicing physicians. Many states require physicians to earn a certain amount of CME credit in order to maintain their licenses.  Physicians can receive CME credit from a variety of activities, including attending live events, publishing peer-reviewed articles, and completing online courses.  The Accreditation Council for Continuing Medical Education (ACCME) determines what activities are eligible for CME.

See also

 Health in the United States
 Issues in higher education in the United States
 The Flexner Report
Combined internal medicine and psychiatry residency
Integrated Medical Curriculum
List of medical schools in the United States

References

External links
 List Of Cardiology continuing medical educations events